McMillan LLP is a Canadian business law firm serving public, private and not-for-profit clients across various industries in North America and around the world. McMillan LLP is the only national Canadian law firm with an office in Hong Kong, in addition to its offices across Canada in Vancouver, Calgary, Toronto, Ottawa and Montréal. The firm has industry groups in different sectors such as technology, energy, oil and gas, mining, construction and infrastructure, automotive, and transportation.

Founding Firms and Mergers
The firm was founded by Newton Rowell in 1903.  At this time, it consisted of three lawyers and was called Rowell, Reid and Wood. By 1910, the firm more than doubled to seven lawyers, a size it kept until the mid-twenties. Gordon McMillan joined the firm in 1921 and practiced for over half of a century, bringing notable clients such as Monarch and BorgWarner.

In 1926, Rhodes Scholar Roland Michener and Osgoode Hall graduate Daniel Lang formed Lang Michener, another firm that would later merge with McMillan LLP. That same year, partners James Lyle Lawrence and Alistair Shaw formed Lawrence & Shaw in Vancouver, British Columbia.

Rowell accepted the appointment as Chief Justice of Ontario in 1936. After his departure, McMillan worked with junior partner Bill Binch to build and expand the firm. By 1945, it was called McMillan, Binch, Wilkinson and Berry.

Throughout the 1940s and 1950s, Binch would drive from Toronto throughout the mid-west and Chicago to solicit work from mid-sized U.S. companies looking to expand into Canada. His pioneering work opened a north-south corridor between McMillan Binch and American businesses that, at the time, belied the trend in many Canadian firms to patch together national networks running east-west.  

In 1989, Lang Michener merged with Lawrence & Shaw, becoming Lang Michener Lawrence & Shaw. The Right Honourable Jean Chrétien practiced with Lang Michener from 1986 to 1990, and Michel Bastarache was appointed a Justice of the Supreme Court of Canada in 1997.

In 2005, Toronto’s McMillan Binch LLP and Montréal’s Mendelsohn LLP  combined to form McMillan Binch Mendelsohn LLP.

A few years later in 2009, McMillan LLP and Thackray Burgess joined forces to found McMillan's third office, based in Calgary.

In January 2011, McMillan LLP and Lang Michener LLP announced a merger, and began operating under McMillan LLP.

Leadership
In 2022, McMillan LLP announced a new, diverse leadership team and a strategic plan focused on growth, equity, diversity and inclusion (EDI). The team is led by CEO Tim Murphy, who is an established Canadian expert on infrastructure and public-private partnerships. Murphy is also a political figure known for his work as the former Chief of Staff to Prime Minister Paul Martin. 

McMillan LLP’s new leadership team also includes:

 John Clifford, Partner, Chief Operating Officer
 Paul Davis, Partner, Chair of the Board of Partners
 Brett Stewart, Partner, Chair of the Risk Management & Finance Committee
 Tushara Weerasooriya, Partner, Chair of the Strategic Planning Committee
 Stephen Wortley, Partner, Chief Client Officer

According to an article in Canadian Lawyer, McMillan follows a “four-pronged” approach to EDI: 

 A diverse leadership team
 Improving awareness of the problem 
 Creating policies and programs 
 Implementing change

In 2016, Murphy joined Mark Resnick and Richard Mahoney as a co-founder for McMillan Vantage Policy Group. McMillan Vantage is a national full-service public affairs consultancy — the only one of its kind anchored in a national law firm. As a sister firm embedded in McMillan LLP’s offices, Vantage services a wide range of Canadian and international clients: 

 Government relations counsel
 Policy and regulatory analysis
 Crisis communications
 ESG and corporate purpose
 Strategic communications services to the public, private and non-profit sectors.

Awards and accolades
2022

McMillan LLP was included on the Advisory Centre on World Trade Organization Law (ACWL) roster of external legal counsel. The firm joins a select group of global law firms that defend the international trade rights of developing countries and least developed countries (LDCs). McMillan LLP's International Trade Group supports WTO members in French and English. 

The ‘Best Lawyers in Canada’ publication listed 89 lawyers from McMillan as ‘Leaders’ and nine as ‘Ones to Watch’ in their respective fields.

Canadian Lawyer magazine named Leila Rafi, firm partner in the Capital Markets & Securities and M&A Groups, as one of the “Top 25 Most Influential Lawyers” in the business category. 

2021

McMillan LLP members were selected by the Canadian Law Awards as winners of Lexpert’s Awards of Excellence for Top Deals in the Capital Markets and Insolvency & Restructuring categories. 

2020

McMillan announced that seven of the firm’s lawyers in McMillan’s Litigation Group were recognized for exceptional expertise in the 2020 Lexpert Special Edition on Canada’s Leading Litigation Lawyers. 

2019 

McMillan LLP was named the Top Canadian Law Firm at the Annual Canadian Hedge Fund Awards for the third consecutive year. 

2018

McMillan was named a thought leader in the future for legal services for Lexology’s legal influencers in Q3.

References

Crosariol, Beppi. "McMillan Binch plans to merge with Mendelsohn", The Globe and Mail. Accessed April 5, 2007.
Wilbur, Tim. "Tim Murphy, the new CEO at McMillan, on his firm's new strategic plan”, Canadian Lawyer, February 8, 2022. Accessed October 17, 2022.
"Advisory Centre on World Trade Organization Law Selects Canada's McMillan LLP for Their List of External Counsel". McMillan LLP. Retrieved 2022-11-22.
"Best Lawyers List for Canada | Best Lawyers". www.bestlawyers.com. Retrieved 2022-11-22.
"Leila Rafi Named to the Top 25 Most Influential Lawyers List". McMillan LLP. Retrieved 2022-11-22.
"Lexpert's 2021 Awards of Excellence For Top Deals". www.lexpert.ca. Retrieved 2022-11-23.
"The 2020 Lexpert Special Edition on Canada's Leading Litigation Lawyers Recognizes Seven McMillan Professionals". McMillan LLP. Retrieved 2022-11-23.
"McMillan LLP Named Top Canadian Law Firm at Annual Canadian Hedge Fund Awards for Third Consecutive Year". McMillan LLP. 2019-10-24. Retrieved 2022-11-23.
"Hub - McMillan LLP". Lexology. Retrieved 2022-11-23.

External links
McMillan LLP Official Website
McMillan LLP Litigation Group
McMillan LLP International Trade Group
McMillan LLP Leadership Team
 Tim Murphy, CEO, Managing Partner
 John Clifford, Partner, Chief Operating Officer
 Paul Davis, Partner, Chair of the Board of Partners
 Brett Stewart, Partner, Chair of the Risk Management & Finance Committee
 Tushara Weerasooriya, Partner, Chair of the Strategic Planning Committee
 Stephen Wortley, Partner, Chief Client Officer

 McMillan Vantage Policy Group
 McMillan LLP Partner Leila Rafi
 Lexology Legal Influencers
 ACWL External Legal Counsel

Law firms of Canada
Law firms established in 1903
1903 establishments in Ontario